Plocamopherus lucayensis is a species of sea slug, a nudibranch, a shell-less marine gastropod mollusk in the family Polyceridae.

Distribution 
This species was described from the Bahamas. It has since been reported from Curacao and Florida.

References

Hamann, J. C. and W. M. Farmer. 1988. Two new species of Plocamopherus from the western warm water Atlantic. The Veliger, 31 68-74.

External links 
 SeaSlug Forum info

Polyceridae
Gastropods described in 1988